Pterostylis irwinii is a species of greenhood orchid endemic to New Zealand. Flowering plants have erect, linear leaves on the flowering stem while non-flowering plants have a rosette of egg-shaped leaves. There is a single green flower with translucent white stripes and reddish-brown tips.

Description
Pterostylis irwinii is a terrestrial, perennial, deciduous, herb with an underground tuber and which often grows in loose colonies. The dorsal sepal and petals are fused, forming a hood or "galea" over the column. It is erect near its base, then curves forward with the dorsal sepal longer than the petals. Flowering occurs between October and January.

Taxonomy and naming
Pterostylis irwinii was first formally described in 1997 by David Jones, Brian Molloy and Mark Clements and the description was published in The Orchadian. The specific epithet (irwinii) honours J. Bruce Irwin who collected the type specimen at Erua near the Tongariro National Park in 1991.

Distribution and habitat
Irwin's greenhood seems to prefer damp positions in tall forest or steep hilly places with basic rocks such as limestone. On the North Island it occurs on the Waimarino River floodplain and near Cape Palliser. On the South Island it grows in the north west as far south as the Buller River with a few observations further south.

Conservation
Pterostylis irwinii is classed as "threatened and nationally endangered" under the New Zealand Threat Classification System.

References

irwinii
Orchids of New Zealand
Plants described in 1997